Darreh Sukhteh (also Romanized as Darreh Sūkhteh and Darreh Sookhteh) is a village in Karchambu-e Shomali Rural District, in the Central District of Buin va Miandasht County, Isfahan Province, Iran. At the 2006 census, its population was 109, in 27 families.

References 

Populated places in Buin va Miandasht County